The GER Class G58 (LNER Class J17) was a class of 0-6-0 steam tender locomotives designed by James Holden for the Great Eastern Railway in England.  The class consisted partly of new locomotives built from 1905 to 1911 and partly of rebuilds of the earlier GER Class F48 built from 1900 to 1903.  The rebuilding started under GER auspices from 1921 and was continued by the London and North Eastern Railway (LNER) after grouping in 1923.

History
The earlier GER Class F48 were built between 1900 and 1903 and had round-top boilers; there were sixty of them. The G58 had Belpaire fireboxes, like those fitted to the F48 No. 1189, and later fitted to the Class D56 Claud Hamilton 4-4-0s. A further thirty of the Belpaire boiler type followed to form Class G58.

Superheating
The class was superheated between 1915 and 1932. From 1921, all the round-top boilers were replaced by the Belpaire type and the majority were of the superheated type.

Blastpipes
At first Macallan blastpipes were fitted, but later the Stone's variable blastpipe was substituted. Plain blastpipes were substituted between 1924 and 1929.

LNER ownership
On the LNER, those retaining round-top fireboxes were classified J16, and those built, or rebuilt, with Belpaire fireboxes were classified J17. The J16 category ceased to exist in 1932.

BR ownership
All the J16s had been rebuilt as J17s by 1932 and 89 J17s passed to British Railways (BR) in 1948. BR numbers were 65500–65589, of which 65500–59 were the rebuilds from F48 (J16). One number (65550) was blank, because locomotive no. 8200 had been destroyed in a German V-2 rocket explosion at Stratford in November 1944. The second locomotive was withdrawn in 1953, and the last in 1962.

Preservation
GER no. 1217 (LNER 8217, 5567, BR 65567) was withdrawn in 1962 and acquired privately for preservation. It is owned by the National Railway Museum, York, as part of the UK National Collection, but is on loan to the Barrow Hill Roundhouse and Railway Centre.

Modelling
A 4 mm scale kit is available from PDK Models

References

 

 Ian Allan ABC of British Railways Locomotives, 1948 edition, part 4, page 41

External links

 The Holden J16 & J17 (GER Classes F48 & G58) 0-6-0 Locomotives — LNER Encyclopedia
  — Great Eastern Railway Society

G58
0-6-0 locomotives
Railway locomotives introduced in 1905
Standard gauge steam locomotives of Great Britain
Freight locomotives